Nathan Templeton (born 9 May 1979) is an Australian journalist. 

Templeton was previously the Melbourne correspondent on the Seven Network's breakfast program, Sunrise.

Career
Early in his career, Templeton worked at Network Ten where he appeared regularly on the network's Breakfast program and also presented reports for 10 News First in Melbourne.

In June 2012, Templeton moved to the Seven Network to join Seven News Melbourne as a sports reporter. He covered major sporting events including the Australian Open.

In May 2016, Templeton joined Sunrise as its Melbourne correspondent, replacing Rebecca Maddern who defected to the Nine Network. He regularly substituted as sports presenter on both Sunrise and Weekend Sunrise.

Templeton was the poolside interviewer for the Seven Network at both the 2016 Olympic Games at Rio de Janeiro and the 2020 Olympic Games held at Tokyo in 2021, and at the 2018 Commonwealth Games on the Gold Coast.

In November 2022, Templeton was replaced as Sunrise Melbourne correspondent by Teegan Dolling.

References

Seven News presenters
10 News First presenters
Australian sports journalists
1979 births
Living people